Lauthaha is a city and a notified area in Purvi Champaran district in the Indian state of Bihar.

Geography
Lauthaha is located at

Demographics
 India census, Lauthaha had a population of 7744. Males constitute 63% of the population and females 37%. Lauthaha has an average literacy rate of 75%, higher than the national average of 59.5%: male literacy is 78%, and female literacy is 70%. In Lauthaha, 10% of the population is under 6 years of age.

Transportation 
Motihari Court railway station is the nearest railway station of Lauthaha town. It is situated on Muzaffarpur–Gorakhpur main line under the Samastipur railway division.

References

Cities and towns in East Champaran district